Acacia aemula is a shrub belonging to the genus Acacia and subgenus Alatae. It is native to an area along the south coast of Western Australia.

Description
It produces white-cream flowers from May to June

Taxonomy
The species was first formally described by the botanist Bruce Maslin in 1995 in the work Acacia Miscellany 13. Taxonomy of some Western Australian phyllocladinous and aphyllodinous taxa (Leguminosae: Mimosoideae) as published in the journal Nuytsia. It was later reclassified as Racosperma aemulum by Leslie Pedley in 2003 then returned to the genus Acacia in 2006.

Two subspecies are recognized :
Acacia aemula subsp. aemula
Acacia aemula subsp. muricata

Distribution
It is found along the south coast of Western Australia in the Great Southern and Goldfields-Esperance regions extending from around Albany east to Cape Arid National Park where it grows among granite outcrops and flats near creeks in sandy soils.

See also
List of Acacia species

References

aemula
Acacias of Western Australia
Plants described in 1995
Taxa named by Bruce Maslin